Chyragly is a village in the Tovuz Rayon of Azerbaijan.

It is suspected that this village has undergone a name change or no longer exists, as no Azerbaijani website mentions it under this name.

References

Populated places in Tovuz District